The 2020 George E. Mitchell Black-Eyed Susan Stakes was the 96th running of the George E. Mitchell Stakes (renamed by Pimlico in 2020). The race took place on October 3, 2020, and was televised in the United States as part of the NBC main card.  Ridden by jockey Daniel Centeno, Miss Marissa won the race by a neck runner-up Bonny South. Approximate post time on the Friday evening before the Preakness Stakes was 4:45 p.m. Eastern Time. The Maryland Jockey Club supplied a purse of $250,000 for the 96th running. The race was run over a fast track in a final time of 1:48.08.  The race was run behind closed doors.

Payout 

The 96th Black-Eyed Susan Stakes Payout Schedule

$2 Exacta:  (9–5) paid   $ 63.20

$1 Trifecta:  (9–5–8) paid   $ 132.20

$1 Superfecta:  (9–5–8-7) paid   $ 617.10

The full chart 

 Winning Breeder: Woodford Thoroughbreds; (KY)  
 Final Time: 1:48.08
 Track Condition: Fast
 Race run behind closed doors under Maryland health orders.

See also 
 2020 Preakness Stakes
 Black-Eyed Susan Stakes Stakes "top three finishers" and # of  starters

References

External links 
 Official Black-Eyed Susan Stakes website
 Official Preakness website

2020 in horse racing
Horse races in Maryland
2020 in American sports
Black-Eyed Susan Stakes
2020 in sports in Maryland
October 2020 sports events in the United States